Bronx Community Board 3 is a local government unit in the New York City borough, of the Bronx, encompassing the neighborhoods of Crotona Park East, Claremont, Concourse Village, Melrose, and Morrisania. It is delimited by Sheridan Boulevard to the east, the Cross Bronx Expressway and Crotona Park North to the north, Park Avenue and Webster Avenue to the west, and East 159th Street and East 161st Street to the south.

Community board staff and membership 
The current chairperson of the Bronx Community board 3 is Dr. Rev. Bruce Rivera. Its District Manager is John Dudley. Currently, Dudley is the longest serving District Manager in the borough of the Bronx. 

The City Council members representing the community district are non-voting, ex officio board members. The council members and their council districts are:
 15th NYC Council District - Ritchie Torres
 16th NYC Council District - Vanessa Gibson
 17th NYC Council District - Rafael Salamanca

Demographics 
As of the United States 2000 Census, the Community Board has a population of 68,574, up from 57,162 in the 1990 Census and 53,638 in 1980.
Of them, 36,273 (52.9%) are of Hispanic origin, 30,201 (44%) are Black, non-Hispanic, 678 (1%) are   White, non-Hispanic, 248 (0.4%) are Asian or Pacific Islander, 216 (0.3%) American Indian or Alaska Native, 169 (0.2%) are some other race (non-Hispanic), and 789 (1.2%) of two or more races (non-Hispanic).

References

External links 
 
 

Community boards of the Bronx